Sergeant Augustin D. Flanagan (August 10, 1844 – January 22, 1924) was an American soldier who fought in the American Civil War. Flanagan received the country's highest award for bravery during combat, the Medal of Honor, for his action during the Battle of Chaffin's Farm in Virginia on 29 September 1864. He was honored with the award on 6 April 1865.

Biography
Flanagan was born in Loretto, Pennsylvania, on 10 August 1844. He enlisted into the 55th Pennsylvania Infantry. He died on 22 January 1924 and his remains are interred at the Tecumseh Cemetery in Nebraska.

Medal of Honor citation

See also

List of American Civil War Medal of Honor recipients: A–F

References

1844 births
1924 deaths
People of Pennsylvania in the American Civil War
Union Army officers
United States Army Medal of Honor recipients
American Civil War recipients of the Medal of Honor